Mary Beth Decker (born January 11, 1981) is an American former model and television personality who attended Texas A&M University. She was the "Cyber Girl of the Week" for Playboy in the fourth week of September 2002, and "Cyber Girl of the Month" for January 2003 as well as a cast member on a season of MTV's show Road Rules, Road Rules: South Pacific.

Personal life
Decker was born in Houston, Texas. While at Texas A&M University she worked as a bartender at The Tap, a bar located in College Station, Texas.

She was featured in two issues of Playboy: October 2002, as part of the Girls of the Big 12 (as an A&M student), and March 2004 as a Cyber Girl. She has appeared on the HDNet show Get Out!, in the season three Costa Rica episode.

On August 31, 2007, she gave birth to a boy named Gavin.

References

External links
 

Living people
Road Rules cast members
Texas A&M University alumni
1981 births